La Violeta was a Spanish language weekly women's magazine with a focus on fashion and literature based in Madrid, Spain. Its subtitle was Revista hispano-americana de literatura, ciencias, teatros y modas. The magazine was in circulation in the period 1862–1866, and had significant contributions to the education of women in the country.

History and profile
La Violeta was established by Faustina Sáez de Melgar in 1862, and the first issue appeared on 7 December 1862. The magazine was dedicated to Queen Isabel II who would become one of the subscribers of the magazine. Its headquarters was in Madrid.

The editors-in-chief of La Violeta were Faustina Sáez de Melgar and her husband, Valentín Melgar, who also financed it. The goal of the magazine which was published weekly on Sundays was to serve as a useful and moral guide to bourgeois women who were the members of the neo-Catholic current. However, the magazine also had male readers. The number of pages varied between eight and sixteen, and the magazine included many different topics, but one of the frequent ones was the examples of the Elizabethan literature written by women, including Rogelia León, Francisca Carlota de Riego Pina, Amalia Díaz, Elena G. de Avellaneda, Ángela Grassi and María José Zapata. Joaquina Carnicero published a fashion chronicle in the magazine and Leandro A. Herrero contributed to the weekly magazine with articles on theatre. The contributors of the magazine, particularly Rogelia León, adopted abolitionist views and were very active in the abolitionist initiatives.

In 1864 La Violeta became an official textbook for high schools by a royal decree, and its subtitle was redesigned as de instrucción primaria, educación, literatura, ciencias, labores, salones, teatros y modas. The last issue was published on 31 December 1866.

References

1862 establishments in Spain
1866 disestablishments in Spain
Defunct literary magazines published in Europe
Defunct magazines published in Spain
Education magazines
Literary magazines published in Spain
Magazines established in 1862
Magazines disestablished in 1866
Magazines published in Madrid
Spanish-language magazines
Theatre magazines
Weekly magazines published in Spain
Women's magazines published in Spain
Women's fashion magazines